A by-election was held for the New South Wales Legislative Assembly electorate of Phillip on 14 August 1954 because of the death of Tom Shannon.

Dates

Candidates
Wal Campbell was the proprietor and editor of The Rock, an anti-catholic paper. He stated that his policies would be similar to Labor, however he was opposed to sectarianism in the party. This was the only time he was a candidate for the Legislative Assembly.
Pat Hills was a toolmaker, engineer and the Lord Mayor of Sydney.

Result

Tom Shannon died.

See also
Electoral results for the district of Phillip
List of New South Wales state by-elections

References

New South Wales state by-elections
1954 elections in Australia
1950s in New South Wales